is a 2022 Japanese film adaptation of the 2021 anime television series Odd Taxi produced by OLM and P.I.C.S. written by Kazuya Kinomoto and directed by Baku Kinoshita. It was released in April 2022 by Asmik Ace in Japan, with Crunchyroll acquiring North American distribution rights.

Plot
The plot of the film was described as a "reconstruction" on the events of the 2021 series, according to a press release by Famitsu, with a depiction of the events which take place after the series finale. The plot of the original series focuses on Odokawa, a middle-aged walrus taxi driver, whose interactions with his customers entangle him into a recent disappearance of a girl.

The end of the movie includes an expanded scene depicting Odokawa's confrontation with Sakura Wadagaki, who was revealed in the series to have killed and replaced Yuki Mitsuya, the missing girl who was a backup singer in Mystery Kiss. In the credits, it is shown that Odokawa survived his encounter with Sakura and that Sakura was arrested for her crimes.

Voice cast
A preliminary list was listed by Famitsu for the cast for the film. The main cast reprise their roles from the main series.

Production
The film's production was announced on December 25, 2021, through the official series' Twitter. The date corresponds to the date of the series finale within the series itself. On the initial release, promotional material depicted the series' protagonist Odokawa in an interrogation room, prompting speculation regarding the film's plot. The film's trailer featured a blend of previous footage from the series and brand-new footage. The film was released on April 1, 2022, in Japan, with an unknown international release date. It was additionally revealed that the cast from the 2021 series would be reprising their roles for the film. Director Baku Kinoshita and writer Kazuya Konomoto additionally would head the production of the film. 

Crunchyroll subsequently announced that it received distribution rights in North America, while Asmik Ace received Japanese distribution rights. On July 15, 2022, Mighty Media announced that they would distribute the film in Taiwan.

Reception

Odd Taxi: In the Woods earned $437,828 at the Japanese box office.

References

External links

2022 anime films
Animated films about animals
Animated films based on animated television series
Japanese animated films
Mystery anime and manga
OLM, Inc. animated films
Crunchyroll anime
Films about taxis